Ultra-wideband (UWB, ultra wideband, ultra-wide band and ultraband) is a radio technology that can use a very low energy level for short-range, high-bandwidth communications over a large portion of the radio spectrum. UWB has traditional applications in non-cooperative radar imaging. Most recent applications target sensor data collection, precise locating, and tracking. UWB support started to appear in high-end smartphones  2019.

Characteristics
Ultra-wideband is a technology for transmitting information across a wide bandwidth (>500 MHz). This allows for the transmission of a large amount of signal energy without interfering with conventional narrowband and carrier wave transmission in the same frequency band. Regulatory limits in many countries allow for this efficient use of radio bandwidth, and enable high-data-rate personal area network (PAN) wireless connectivity, longer-range low-data-rate applications, and the transparent co-existence of radar and imaging systems with existing communications systems.

Ultra-wideband was formerly known as pulse radio, but the FCC and the International Telecommunication Union Radiocommunication Sector (ITU-R) currently define UWB as an antenna transmission for which emitted signal bandwidth exceeds the lesser of 500 MHz or 20% of the arithmetic center frequency. Thus, pulse-based systems—where each transmitted pulse occupies the UWB bandwidth (or an aggregate of at least 500 MHz of a narrow-band carrier; for example, orthogonal frequency-division multiplexing (OFDM))—can access the UWB spectrum under the rules.

Theory 
A significant difference between conventional radio transmissions and UWB is that conventional systems transmit information by varying the power level, frequency, and/or phase of a sinusoidal wave. UWB transmissions transmit information by generating radio energy at specific time intervals and occupying a large bandwidth, thus enabling pulse-position or time modulation. The information can also be modulated on UWB signals (pulses) by encoding the polarity of the pulse, its amplitude and/or by using orthogonal pulses. UWB pulses can be sent sporadically at relatively low pulse rates to support time or position modulation, but can also be sent at rates up to the inverse of the UWB pulse bandwidth. Pulse-UWB systems have been demonstrated at channel pulse rates in excess of 1.3 billion pulses per second using a continuous stream of UWB pulses (Continuous Pulse UWB or C-UWB), while supporting forward error-correction encoded data rates in excess of 675 Mbit/s.

A UWB radio system can be used to determine the "time of flight" of the transmission at various frequencies. This helps overcome multipath propagation, since some of the frequencies have a line-of-sight trajectory, while other indirect paths have longer delays. With a cooperative symmetric two-way metering technique, distances can be measured to high resolution and accuracy.

Applications

Real-time location 
UWB is useful for real-time locating systems, and its precision capabilities and low power make it well-suited for radio-frequency-sensitive environments, such as hospitals. UWB is also useful for peer-to-peer fine ranging, which allows many applications based on relative distance between two entities.

Mobile telephony 
Apple launched the first three phones with ultra-wideband capabilities in September 2019, namely, the iPhone 11, iPhone 11 Pro, and iPhone 11 Pro Max. Apple also launched Series 6 of Apple Watch in September 2020, which features UWB, and their AirTags featuring this technology was revealed at a press event on April 20, 2021. The Samsung Galaxy Note 20 Ultra, Galaxy S21+, and Galaxy S21 Ultra also began supporting UWB, along with the Samsung Galaxy SmartTag+.
The Xiaomi MIX 4 released in August 2021 supports UWB, and offers the capability of connecting to select AIoT devices.

The FiRa Consortium was founded in August 2019 to develop interoperable UWB ecosystems including mobile phones. Samsung, Xiaomi, & Oppo are currently members of the FiRa Consortium. In November 2020, Android Open Source Project received first patches related to an upcoming UWB API; feature-complete UWB support is expected in later versions of Android.

Digital keys 
A UWB Digital Car Key operates based on the distance between a car and a smartphone.

Products 
A small number of UWB integrated circuits focused on location systems are in production or planned for production .

Industrial applications 
UWB has been evaluated for use in signaling of the New York City Subway.

Radar 
Ultra-wideband gained widespread attention for its implementation in synthetic aperture radar (SAR) technology. Due to its high resolution capacities using lower frequencies, UWB SAR was heavily researched for its object-penetration ability. Starting in the early 1990s, the U.S. Army Research Laboratory (ARL) developed various stationary and mobile ground-, foliage-, and wall-penetrating radar platforms that served to detect and identify buried IEDs and hidden adversaries at a safe distance. Examples include the railSAR, the boomSAR, the SIRE radar, and the SAFIRE radar. ARL has also investigated the feasibility of whether UWB radar technology can incorporate Doppler processing to estimate the velocity of a moving target when the platform is stationary. While a 2013 report highlighted the issue with the use of UWB waveforms due to target range migration during the integration interval, more recent studies have suggested that UWB waveforms can demonstrate better performance compared to conventional Doppler processing as long as a correct matched filter is used.

Ultra-wideband pulse Doppler radars have also been used to monitor vital signs of the human body, such as heart rate and respiration signals as well as human gait analysis and fall detection. It serves as a potential alternative to continuous-wave radar systems since it involves less power consumption and a high-resolution range profile. However, its low signal-to-noise ratio has made it vulnerable to errors. A commercial example of this application is RayBaby, which is a baby monitor that detects breathing and heart rate to determine whether a baby is asleep or awake. Raybaby has a detection range of five meters and can detect fine movements of less than a millimeter.

Ultra-wideband is also used in "see-through-the-wall" precision radar-imaging technology, precision locating and tracking (using distance measurements between radios), and precision time-of-arrival-based localization approaches. It is efficient, with a spatial capacity of approximately 1013 bit/s/m2.
UWB radar has been proposed as the active sensor component in an Automatic Target Recognition application, designed to detect humans or objects that have fallen onto subway tracks.

Data transfer 
Ultra-wideband characteristics are well-suited to short-range applications, such as PC peripherals, wireless monitors, camcorders, wireless printing, and file transfers to portable media players. UWB was proposed for use in personal area networks, and appeared in the IEEE 802.15.3a draft PAN standard. However, after several years of deadlock, the IEEE 802.15.3a task group was dissolved in 2006. The work was completed by the WiMedia Alliance and the USB Implementer Forum. Slow progress in UWB standards development, the cost of initial implementation, and performance significantly lower than initially expected are several reasons for the limited use of UWB in consumer products (which caused several UWB vendors to cease operations in 2008 and 2009).

Regulation 
In the U.S., ultra-wideband refers to radio technology with a bandwidth exceeding the lesser of 500 MHz or 20% of the arithmetic center frequency, according to the U.S. Federal Communications Commission (FCC). A February 14, 2002 FCC Report and Order authorized the unlicensed use of UWB in the frequency range from 3.1 to 10.6 GHz. The FCC power spectral density (PSD) emission limit for UWB transmitters is −41.3 dBm/MHz. This limit also applies to unintentional emitters in the UWB band (the "Part 15" limit). However, the emission limit for UWB emitters may be significantly lower (as low as −75 dBm/MHz) in other segments of the spectrum.

Deliberations in the International Telecommunication Union Radiocommunication Sector (ITU-R) resulted in a Report and Recommendation on UWB in November 2005. UK regulator Ofcom announced a similar decision on 9 August 2007.

There has been concern over interference between narrowband and UWB signals that share the same spectrum. Earlier, the only radio technology that used pulses was spark-gap transmitters, which international treaties banned because they interfere with medium-wave receivers. However, UWB uses much lower levels of power. The subject was extensively covered in the proceedings that led to the adoption of the FCC rules in the US, and in the meetings of the ITU-R leading to its Report and Recommendations on UWB technology. Commonly-used electrical appliances emit impulsive noise (for example, hair dryers), and proponents successfully argued that the noise floor would not be raised excessively by wider deployment of low power wideband transmitters.

Coexistence with other standards 
In February 2002, the Federal Communications Commission (FCC) released an amendment (Part 15) that specifies the rules of UWB transmission and reception. According to this release, any signal with fractional bandwidth greater than 20% or having a bandwidth greater than 500 MHz is considered as an UWB signal. The FCC ruling also defines access to 7.5 GHz of unlicensed spectrum between 3.1 and 10.6 GHz that is made available for communication and measurement systems.

Narrowband signals that exist in the UWB range, such as IEEE 802.11a transmissions, may exhibit high PSD levels compared to UWB signals as seen by a UWB receiver. As a result, one would expect a degradation of UWB bit error rate performance. Notched UWB antennas  and filters are designed for coexistence of UWB devices with narrowband devices.

Technology groups

See also

References

External links 
 IEEE 802.15.4a Includes a C-UWB physical layer, may be obtained from 
Standard ECMA-368 High Rate Ultra Wideband PHY and MAC Standard
Standard ECMA-369 MAC-PHY Interface for ECMA-368
Standard ISO/IEC 26907:2007
Standard ISO/IEC 26908:2007
ITU-R Recommendations – SM series See: RECOMMENDATION  ITU R  SM.1757 Impact of devices using ultra-wideband technology on systems operating within radiocommunication services.
FCC (GPO) Title 47, Section 15 of the Code of Federal Regulations  SubPart F: Ultra-wideband
 Use of MIMO techniques for UWB
Numerous useful links and resources regarding Ultra-Wideband and UWB testbeds – WCSP Group – University of South Florida (USF)
The Ultra-Wideband Radio Laboratory at the University of Southern California

Data transmission
Radio communications
Radio technology